Giuseppe Schirò (junior) (Contessa Entellina1905– Rome1984), was an Italian scholar and literary historian.

Schirò was of Arbëreshë descent. He was born in Contessa Entellina, Sicily. He was referred as "junior" to distinguish him from the "Senior", the Arberesh poet Giuseppe Schirò (1865 – 1927).

Schirò studied at the Corsini college in San Demetrio Corone in Calabria. He worked as a teacher in Padua and Rome. Schirò's wrote on Albanian culture, the first work appeared in the 1940s. He is remembered in particular for his
"Storia della letteratura albanese" ("History of Albanian Literature") published in Firenze in 1959, being one of the most reliable histories of Albanian literature.

References

1905 births
1984 deaths
People from Contessa Entellina
Italian people of Arbëreshë descent
Italian male writers
Writers from the Province of Palermo